Halifax West High School is a Canadian public high school located in the Clayton Park neighbourhood in the Halifax Regional Municipality, Nova Scotia. Encompassing grades 10 through 12, Halifax West High School offers a variety of courses in both French and English as well as International Baccalaureate (IB) diplomas for its enrollment of 1550 students as of September 2015. Halifax West has four feeder schools: Fairview Junior High, Clayton Park Junior High, Park West School, and Brookside Junior High. It is also home to the Bella Rose Arts Centre. Halifax West also hosted The Canadian Student Leadership Conference in September 2015, an event that drew hundreds of student participants from across Canada.

History

Halifax West High School was constructed in 1958 on Dutch Village Road in the suburban community of Fairview.  Originally known as Halifax West Municipal High School during the 1960s, students came by bus from a widespread area including Rockingham, Spryfield, Sheffield Mills, Sambro, Head of St. Margaret's Bay and Hubbards.

Over the decades, the school building underwent several renovations and the word Municipal was removed from the name.

During the late 1990s, teachers and  students started to become sick as a result of poor air quality.  The building underwent another renovation in an attempt to rid the toxic substances. Still tests yielded poor air quality, specifically in one area of the school where the science and art labs were located. In the 1999–2000 school year, this portion of the school was closed off, and in May of that same school year tests were again conducted all around the school on the air quality. The school remained open until the end of the year regardless of these issues.

In July 2000, it was made public that Halifax West High School was too sick to be occupied, and a meeting was held at a nearby junior high school to discuss options and plans of what to do. The School Board Proposal was to absorb the Halifax West community into the other high schools in the HRM, however the outrage from the community quickly stopped these plans. At the meeting, other options were discussed, including using the building of a new junior high school that was yet to open in the Clayton Park West neighbourhood. Other plans were for many portables to be used to accommodate the classes. Still the most feasible plan was to go into split shifts while a concrete plan of action was created.

The students of Halifax West took school buses from various locations around the neighbourhood to J. L. Ilsley High School in nearby Spryfield. The 2000 - 2001 school year was spent on split shift, with the native students of J. L. Ilsley starting classes at 7:30 am, and ending at 12:30 noon, while the Halifax West students would start classes 12:45 noon and end at 5:45 pm. In the winter months, both schools faced the hazard of riding buses in the early morning or early evening darkness.

For the 2001 - 2002 school year, another plan was devised. For the first semester, (September - December) the students of HWHS would be split up somewhat. The grade 10 and grade 11 classes would be conducted at B.C. Silver, an abandoned junior high school close to J. L. Ilsley. The grade 12s would attend J. L. Ilsley, with their own teachers, however attend classes during the same time and on the same bell system as the J. L Ilsley students. For the second Semester, the students were all amalgamated into one building. This building was the Gordon Bell Building located in Cole Harbour Nova Scotia, approximately 45 minutes and one bridge crossing away from the old Halifax West. Although it was far away, the students of Halifax West were generally happy to be together, and even happier to be in a healthy building.

During these years in limbo, the Halifax West community was lobbying for a new school. After several years of pressure on provincial and municipal politicians, the Department of Education agreed to fund a new school in the suburb of Clayton Park, adjacent to Fairview.  The new structure was built in the Clayton Park West neighbourhood, near the summit of Geizers Hill, and was completed in the fall of 2002. There was a great deal of debate as to what the name of the school would be. The Students of the HWHS worked to maintain the name, as it would be a testament to the fact that after all the time they spent in limbo, they were not just a building, but rather a community. The Students of Halifax West spent one more semester in the Gordon Bell Building, and then attended the new structure which opened in January 2003 as Halifax West High School. Upon opening in 2003 it was decided the four feeder schools would be Fairview Junior High, Clayton Park Junior High, Park West School, and Brookside Junior High.

During the design phase of the new school building, provisions were made for adding a large auditorium which would function as a community theatre, to be constructed at a later date after fundraising was completed. Construction of this new auditorium began in February 2007 and finished in June 2007 with the theatre opening in October 2007.

Sports teams

The Halifax West High School athletics department offers varsity and intramural sports teams for sports such as curling, football, hockey, soccer, volleyball, basketball, badminton, track and field, softball, baseball, field hockey, wrestling and rugby.

Halifax West's boys' varsity soccer team won the NSSAF provincial championship in 1999. Halifax West's boys' varsity soccer team has won provincial championships four years in a row (2003–2004, 2004–2005, 2005–2006, 2006–2007), and is only the second high school in Nova Scotia to ever do so. The team went undefeated in 2012–2013 to win the NSSAF provincial championship with a record of 16 wins and 2 draws.

Halifax West's Junior Varsity Boys' Soccer Team won the NSSAF Provincial Championship three times (2005–2006 and 2006–2007).

Halifax West's girls' varsity soccer team has won three provincial championships (2005-2006, 2007–2008 and 2008–2009).

The Halifax West Football Rams first took to the gravel field in August 1965.

The West Warriors Football team won  provincial championships in 1991 and in 2003. In the 2012–2013 season they won the tier 2 championship defeating JL Ilsley.

The Halifax West boys' basketball team has won 4 provincial championships.

The Halifax West's girls' rugby won provincials in 2013, defeating the defending champions Horton High. They also won provincials in 2014, defending their own title and beating Citadel High School.

From 2004 to 2006, the Halifax West Ski team placed first in both male and female GS races in provincials.

Clubs

Halifax West High School has a variety of student extracurricular clubs, teams, committees, and societies, including student government, model parliament, philosophy, robotics, yearbook, debate, multiculturalism, knitting, yoga, improv, math, film production, and numerous musical ensembles.

CSLC 2015

Halifax West High School was selected as the 2015 host for the Canadian Student Leadership Conference. This event brought together 800 student leaders and 200 of their teachers to participate in Leadership Activities, Keynote Presentations, and Skill Building Workshops.

Stage productions
The school has produced the following musical theatre productions:
2001: Fame
2002: Grease
2003: Guys & Dolls
2004: West Side Story
2005: The Pajama Game
2006: Les Misérables
2007: Jesus Christ Superstar
2008: Kiss Me, Kate
2009: How to Succeed in Business Without Really Trying
2010: A Chorus Line
2011: Dr. Horrible's Sing-Along Blog, a student-run production 
2011: Rent
2013: Anything Goes
2014: Fame
2015: Man of La Mancha
2016: Mary Poppins
2019: Hairspray
2023: Matilda

Pop culture 
Halifax West High School was used as a set for shots for 2004 Lifetime film She's Too Young as "Clinton West High School".

References

External links 
 School website
 School profile at Halifax Regional School Board

High schools in Halifax, Nova Scotia
Educational institutions established in 1958
Schools in Halifax, Nova Scotia
International Baccalaureate schools in Nova Scotia
1958 establishments in Canada